Marc Pierre Detton (20 February 1901 – 24 January 1977) was a French rower who competed in the 1924 Summer Olympics.

In 1924 he won the silver medal with his partner Jean-Pierre Stock in the double sculls event. He also participated in the single sculls, but was eliminated in the repechage.

References

External links
 Olympics database profile

1901 births
1977 deaths
French male rowers
Olympic rowers of France
Rowers at the 1924 Summer Olympics
Olympic silver medalists for France
Olympic medalists in rowing
Medalists at the 1924 Summer Olympics
European Rowing Championships medalists
20th-century French people